Frank Huyler (born 24 September 1964) is an emergency physician, poet and author in Albuquerque, New Mexico. He is best known for his book The Blood of Strangers: True Stories from the Emergency Room which has been translated into a number of languages.

Early life and education
Frank Huyler was born in 1964, in Berkeley, California, to parents who were both teachers at international schools. He attended kindergarten in London, and moved to Iran with his family when he was in his teens.

He is a graduate of Williams College and received his medical education at the University of North Carolina at Chapel Hill from where he qualified as a physician in 1996.

Career
Huyler practices as an emergency physician in Albuquerque, New Mexico.

Writing
Huyler has published a number of books of poetry, fiction, and non-fiction. He is best known for his book The Blood of Strangers: True Stories from the Emergency Room which has been translated into a number of languages.

Selected publications
 The Blood of Strangers: True Stories from the Emergency Room. University of California Press, Berkeley, 1999. .
 The Laws of Invisible Things (2004)
 Right of Thirst (2009)

References

External links 
https://www.encyclopedia.com/arts/educational-magazines/huyler-frank-1964
https://emed.unm.edu/directory/faculty-bios/frank-huyler.html

Living people
1964 births
American emergency physicians
American male poets
American medical writers
American male novelists
Williams College alumni
University of North Carolina School of Medicine alumni
University of New Mexico faculty
21st-century American novelists
Place of birth missing (living people)
People from Berkeley, California
21st-century American male writers